John Dorney (8 January 1887 – 15 May 1956) was an Irish hurler who played for Cork Senior Championship club St Finbarr's. He also had a brief career at senior level with the Cork county team, during which he usually lined out at centre-back.

Honours
St Finbarr's
Cork Senior Hurling Championship (3): 1919, 1922, 1923

Cork
Munster Junior Hurling Championship (1): 1912

References

1887 births
1956 deaths
St Finbarr's hurlers
Cork inter-county hurlers